Ian Hewett (born 24 January 1976) is an Australian former cricketer. He played three first-class cricket matches for Victoria between 1996 and 2002.

See also
 List of Victoria first-class cricketers

References

External links
 

1976 births
Living people
Australian cricketers
Victoria cricketers
Cricketers from Melbourne